Wine Spectator is an American lifestyle magazine that focuses on wine and wine culture, and gives out ratings to certain types of wine. It publishes 15 issues per year with content that includes news, articles, profiles, and general entertainment pieces. Each issue also includes from 400 to more than 1,000 wine reviews, which consist of wine ratings and tasting notes. The publication also awards its 100 chosen top wineries each year with the Winery of the Year Awards.

Wine Spectator, like most other major wine publications, rates wine on a 100-point scale. The magazine's policy also states that editors review wines in blind tastings. Wine Spectator's current critics include executive editor Thomas Mathews; editor-at-large Harvey Steiman; senior editors James Laube, Kim Marcus, Bruce Sanderson, Tim Fish, James Molesworth, Alison Napjus and MaryAnn Worobiec; associate editor Gillian Sciaretta and associate tasting coordinator Aleksandar Zecevic. Past critics include former managing editor Jim Gordon, Per-Henrik Mansson, former senior editor and European bureau chief James Suckling, who served at the magazine from 1981 to 2010, and former senior editor Nathan Wesley, who worked in the magazine's tasting department from 2005 to 2013.

Background and history 

Founded as a San Diego-based tabloid newspaper by Bob Morrisey in 1976, The Wine Spectator was purchased three years later by current publisher and editor Marvin R. Shanken. That year, its panel of experts blind tasted and reviewed over 12,400 wines.

In 1981 the magazine introduced its Restaurant Awards program, which reviews restaurant wine lists on three levels: the Award of Excellence (basic), Best of Award of Excellence (second-tier), and the Grand Award (highest). As of 2017, more than 3,500 restaurants held one of these awards.

The magazine organized and sponsored the Wine Spectator Wine Tasting of 1986 on the tenth anniversary of the "Judgment of Paris". In 2008 the magazine was ranked by the Luxury Institute as the No. 1 business and consumer publication among wealthy readers. The publication lost longtime senior editor Kim Marcus in January 2022.

Other activities 

Wine Spectator operates the Wine Experience, a yearly event that includes wine tastings, seminars, lunches and an awards banquet. In 2017, more than 5,000 people attended in New York City where more than 265 wines were poured just at the two evening Grand Tastings.

The magazine's Grand Tour takes the tastings on the road to three cities each spring, with more than 240 wineries pouring at the events.

The magazine also runs the Wine Spectator Scholarship Foundation, which as of 2016 has raised more than $20 million to support wine and food education and scholarship programs.

Criticism 

The magazine's Restaurant Awards program has come under some criticism. At the August 2008 conference of the American Association of Wine Economists in Portland, Oregon, a hoax exposé submission of the fictitious restaurant Osteria L'Intrepido was revealed by the author and Fearless Critic founder Robin Goldstein: he had won an Award of Excellence for a restaurant that didn't exist and whose "reserve wine list" was full of the lowest-rated Italian wines in history. He stated the exposé to be part of research for an academic paper, whose aim was to discover what it takes for a restaurant's wine list to receive an award from the magazine. With nearly 4,500 restaurant applications, the magazine takes in over $1 million each year from submission fees. Editor Thomas Matthews published an official response on the magazine's forum site.

See also 

 List of food and drink magazines

References

External links 

 
 Wine Spectator videos
  https://www.wineauctionprices.com/

Lifestyle magazines published in the United States
Magazines established in 1976
Magazines published in New York City
Wine magazines